"People Are Alike All Over" is episode 25 of the American television anthology series The Twilight Zone.

Opening narration

Plot
Two astronauts discuss an impending mission to Mars. One of them, Marcusson, is a positive thinker who believes that people are alike all over, even on the Red Planet. The other astronaut, Conrad, has a more cynical view of human interplanetary nature. After their rocket lands on Mars, the impact is so severe that Marcusson is critically injured. Knowing that he is dying, Marcusson pleads with Conrad to open the door of their ship so he can at least see that for which he has given his life. Conrad refuses, still fearful of what may await outside, and Marcusson dies.

Now alone, Conrad hears a rhythmic sound reverberating upon the ship's hull. Expecting some unnamed, alien evil, his apprehension turns to joy when he opens the hatch and sees Martians that indeed appear to be human, have mind-reading abilities, and give the impression of being most amicable, especially the beautiful Teenya, who welcomes and reassures him. The hospitable locals lead their honored guest to his residence — an interior living space furnished precisely in the same manner as one on Earth (specifically, a living space in middle-class America) would have been. The locals leave and Conrad asks if he will see Teenya again. She doesn't respond, but another local assures Conrad he will see her again.

Conrad relaxes but soon discovers that his room is windowless and the doors cannot be opened. One of the walls slides apart, and Conrad realizes that he has become a caged exhibit in a Martian alien zoo. Conrad picks up a sign that says, "EARTH CREATURE in his native habitat", and throws it on the floor as Teenya leaves distraught.

In the episode's closing lines, Conrad grips the bars and proclaims, "Marcusson! Marcusson, you were right! You were right. People are alike.... people are alike everywhere."

Closing narration

Production notes
This episode was based on Paul W. Fairman's "Brothers Beyond the Void", published in the March 1952 issue of Fantastic Adventures  and also included in August Derleth's 1953 anthology collection Worlds of Tomorrow. In this renowned short story, Sam Conrad remains on Earth and it is the lone pilot Marcusson who has the too-close encounter with smaller, more alien Martians. In adapting the tale, Serling made key changes that would deepen the irony and heighten the impact. He installed the apprehensive, defeatist Conrad as the protagonist, easing his fears, only to have them ultimately confirmed, and he presented the Martians as a human-like superior race whose apparent benevolence would make their climactic treachery seem even more shocking, as well as decrease the budget that would have been expended on costumes and makeup.

The Martian exteriors are taken from the oversize painted background dioramas seen in the 1956 Metro-Goldwyn-Mayer film Forbidden Planet. Additionally, a set of four lights on the wall of the inside of the space ship are reuses of the Krell power gauges from the same film.  Also, the set for Conrad's home is the "I Dream of Jeannie" house.

Marcusson is portrayed by Paul Comi, a frequent guest star in TV shows of the 1960s and 1970s, including Star Trek.  His other TZ work was in the second season's "The Odyssey of Flight 33", where he played the co-pilot, and the fourth season's "The Parallel".

Actor Byron Morrow twice appeared as an admiral on Star Trek.  Actor Vic Perrin was later the "Control Voice" of The Outer Limits, and—like Oliver, Morrow and Comi—would also become another veteran of Star Trek.

Themes
Cat Yampell, comparing the show to other science fiction stories such as Planet of the Apes (also starring Roddy McDowall) and Slaughterhouse-Five, wrote: "Alien caging of humans provides commentary on the barbarity of the practice of turning sentient beings into public spectacles."

Influence
The original pilot of Star Trek ("The Cage", later reworked into the two-part episode "The Menagerie") included plot points similar to that touched upon in this episode, particularly the aspect of humans being put on display for study. Coincidentally, that pilot also co-starred Susan Oliver in a similar role (Vina, a female has the task of making the captive feel more at ease). The Star Trek animated episode "Eye of the Beholder" would also feature some of the crew of the USS Enterprise being placed in a zoo by the inhabitants of Lactra VII.

The band Space Monkey Death Sequence released their similarly titled debut album, "People Are Alike All Over", containing many samples from the episodes, citing the installment as the influence for the album.

The second episode of the television series The Orville, which is titled Command Performance, revolves around the two main characters, Captain Ed Mercer and Commander Kelly Grayson, being placed in a zoo along with other captured alien species.

Further reading
DeVoe, Bill. (2008). Trivia from The Twilight Zone. Albany, GA: Bear Manor Media. 
Grams, Martin. (2008). The Twilight Zone: Unlocking the Door to a Television Classic. Churchville, MD: OTR Publishing.

References

External links
 

1960 American television episodes
Fiction about alien zoos
Mars in television
Television episodes about death
Television episodes written by Rod Serling
The Twilight Zone (1959 TV series season 1) episodes
Works about astronauts
Television shows based on short fiction